Southend Interactive was a game development studio based in Malmö, Sweden and founded in 1998. Southend worked on game productions from various genres that run from various clients, such as Ubisoft and Sierra Online. They also created games for Microsoft's Xbox Live Arcade service on the Xbox 360. Southend's company slogan was "Tomorrow's experiences today."

Southend shuttered in June 2013 when Ubisoft Massive acquired Southend's 24 developers and some technology to be used in Massive's Tom Clancy's The Division massively multiplayer online game. Southend had been seeking a suitor and partially blamed its publisher, Deep Silver, for the company's closure.

Games

References

External links

Companies based in Malmö
Video game companies established in 1998
Video game companies disestablished in 2013
1998 establishments in Sweden
2013 disestablishments in Sweden
Defunct video game companies of Sweden
Video game development companies